Larry Andrew Archambeault (February 22, 1919 - May 6, 1981 ) was a Canadian professional ice hockey player.

Between 1938 and 1953, Archambeault played for various teams in the Eastern Hockey League, American Hockey League, Pacific Coast Hockey League and the United States Hockey League.

His name was actually Laurier André Archambeault, but was anglicized when he moved to the United States.

References

External links

1919 births
1981 deaths
Buffalo Bisons (AHL) players
Canadian ice hockey left wingers
Ice hockey people from Gatineau
Johnstown Jets players
Louisville Blades players
New York Rovers players
Pittsburgh Hornets players
Seattle Ironmen players
Washington Lions players
Canadian expatriate ice hockey players in the United States